Whitefish Lake 128 is an Indian reserve of the Saddle Lake Cree Nation in Alberta, located between Smoky Lake County and the County of St. Paul No. 19. It is 68 kilometres west of Bonnyville. In the 2016 Canadian Census, it recorded a population of 1310 living in 291 of its 319 total private dwellings.

References

Indian reserves in Alberta